Sugar Cookies (also known as Love Me My Way) is a 1973 erotic softcore crime drama film directed by Theodore Gershuny.

It was co-written by future president of Troma Entertainment Lloyd Kaufman and produced by future director Oliver Stone.

When an attractive young model (Lynn Lowry) is tricked into committing suicide on camera by her pornographer boyfriend, her lesbian partner (Mary Woronov) has a vengeful plan: with the help of an exact lookalike of her lover, she hatches a scheme to take down the sleazy drug dealer for good.

Kaufman wrote the film in 1973 and, along with Theodore Gershuny and Ami Artzi, formed a film company called Armor Films in order to produce it. Kaufman was able to raise $100,000 himself and was set to direct, hiring friend Oliver Stone to associate produce. Before production, Kaufman decided to hand the position of director over to the more experienced Gershuny, who, in return, rewrote Kaufman's script and cast his then-wife Mary Woronov.

Cast
 George Shannon - Max Pavell 
 Mary Woronov - Camilla Stone 
 Lynn Lowry - Alta Leigh / Julie Kent 
 Monique van Vooren - Helene 
 Maureen Byrnes - Dola 
 Daniel Sadur - Gus 
 Ondine - Roderick
 Jennifer Welles - Max's Secretary

See also
 Tonight for Sure, the directorial debut of Francis Ford Coppola
 The Party at Kitty and Stud's, the debut of Sylvester Stallone
 Caligula, with Malcolm McDowell, Peter O'Toole, John Gielgud and Helen Mirren
 Abel Ferrara, former pornographic film director
 Jerry Stahl, former pornographic screenwriter

References

External links
 
  Sugar Cookies – at the Troma Entertainment movie database

1973 films
1970s erotic thriller films
American erotic thriller films
American independent films
Troma Entertainment films
1970s pornographic films
1970s English-language films
1970s American films